Karlsson på taket  is a 2002 Swedish animated feature film directed by Vibeke Idsøe.

Rollista 
 Börje Ahlstedt – Karlsson på taket
 William Svedberg – Svante "Junior" Svantesson
 Pernilla August – Mrs. Svantesson, mother
 Allan Svensson – Mr. Svantesson, father
 Margaretha Krook – Miss Hildur Bock
 Nils Eklund – Uncle Julius Jansson
 Magnus Härenstam – Filip "Fille", thief
 Brasse Brännström – Rudolf "Rulle", thief
 Leo Magnusson – Bosse Svantesson
 Ellen Ekdahl – Bettan Svantesson
 Greta Rechlin – Gunilla, classmate
 Jonatan Skifs – Krister, classmate
 Steve Kratz – Fireman
 Maria Rydberg – Teacheress
 Per Sandborgh – Newsreader

External links 

Swedish animated films
2002 animated films
2002 films
2000s Swedish films